Mihhail Selevko (born 20 November 2002) is an Estonian figure skater. He is the 2019 Tallinn Trophy champion, the 2022 Challenge Cup silver medalist, and a two-time Estonian national champion (2019, 2023). He has competed in the final segment at two ISU Championships.

Personal life 
Selevko was born on 20 November 2002, in Tallinn, Estonia to Ukrainian immigrants Galina and Anatoli Selevko. His mother is an accountant, and his father is a computer programmer. Selevko's older brother Aleksandr also represents Estonia internationally in figure skating. He can speak Estonian, Russian, and English, and is learning Finnish.

Programs

Competitive highlights 
GP: Grand Prix; CS: Challenger Series; JGP: Junior Grand Prix

References

External links 
 
 

2002 births
Living people
Estonian male single skaters
Figure skaters from Tallinn
Estonian people of Ukrainian descent